Henry James Wells (born 1906, in Dallas) was an American jazz trombonist, vocalist, and bandleader. He was the brother of Dicky Wells.

Wells studied at Fisk University and the Cincinnati Conservatory, and worked professionally starting in the late 1920s. He joined Jimmie Lunceford's band in 1929 and remained with him until 1935; during this time, he also played with Cab Calloway and Claude Hopkins. From 1936 to 1941 he worked intermittently with Andy Kirk, and played with him again in 1946; he left Kirk's employ temporarily to put together his own band and to complete a stint in the U.S. Army. During his time with Kirk, he was often employed as a vocalist, including on recordings. He also played with Gene Krupa and Teddy Hill in the early 1940s. After World War II he worked with Rex Stewart and Sy Oliver; he was active as a performer on the West Coast into the 1960s.

References
"Henry Wells". The New Grove Dictionary of Jazz. 2nd edition, ed. Barry Kernfeld.

External links
 Henry Wells recordings at the Discography of American Historical Recordings.

American jazz trombonists
Male trombonists
American jazz singers
American male singers
Year of death unknown
1906 births
Musicians from Dallas
Jazz musicians from Texas
American male jazz musicians
Fisk University alumni